Toafofoa Sipley (born 5 January 1995) is a Niue international rugby league footballer who plays as a  for the Manly Warringah Sea Eagles in the NRL. 

He previously played for the New Zealand Warriors in the National Rugby League.

Background
Sipley was born in Auckland, New Zealand and is of Samoan and Niuean descent. 

He played his junior rugby league for the Richmond Rovers, before being signed by the New Zealand Warriors.

Playing career

Early career
From 2013 to 2015, Sipley played for the New Zealand Warriors' NYC team. On 5 October 2014, he played in the Warriors' 2014 NYC Grand Final win over the Brisbane Broncos. He captained the side in 2015. On 2 May 2015, he played for the Junior Kiwis against the Junior Kangaroos. On 3 June 2015, he re-signed with the Warriors on a 2-year contract.

2016
Sipley graduated to the Warriors' Intrust Super Premiership NSW team in 2016. In Round 9 of the season, he made his NRL debut for the Warriors against the St. George Illawarra Dragons.

2017
In June, Sipley signed a two-year contract with the Manly Warringah Sea Eagles for the 2018/2019 seasons.

2018
On 19 May, Toafofoa Sipley made his club debut for Manly Warringah against the Melbourne Storm in the 24-4 win at AAMI Park. Sipley made a total of 4 appearances for Manly in the 2018 NRL season as the club endured one of their worst ever seasons finishing 15th on the table and narrowly avoiding the wooden spoon.

On 27 October, Sipley made his debut for Niue against Italy. In this match, he scored a try as Niue lost 36–32.

2019
Sipley made 10 appearances for Manly Warringah in the 2019 NRL season as the club reached the finals. Sipley played in Manly's elimination final victory over Cronulla-Sutherland at Brookvale Oval.

2020 & 2021
Sipley made no appearances for Manly in the 2020 NRL season.  In round 16 of the 2021 NRL season, he scored two tries for Manly in a 66-0 victory over Canterbury.
Sipley played 20 games for Manly in the 2021 NRL season but did not feature in their finals campaign which saw them reach the preliminary final stage before losing to South Sydney.

2022
Sipley made 19 appearances for Manly in the 2022 NRL season as the club finished 11th on the table. He was one of seven players involved in the Manly pride jersey player boycott.

References

External links

Manly Sea Eagles profile
New Zealand Warriors profile

1995 births
Living people
Junior Kiwis players
Manly Warringah Sea Eagles players
New Zealand people of Niuean descent
New Zealand sportspeople of Samoan descent
New Zealand rugby league players
New Zealand Warriors players
Niue national rugby league team players
Richmond Bulldogs players
Rugby league players from Auckland
Rugby league props
Rugby league second-rows